is a road interchange located in Nerima, Tokyo, Japan.

Expressway 

East Nippon Expressway Company

Adjacent Interchanges 

|-
|colspan=5 style="text-align:center;" |East Expressway Company

Roads in Tokyo
Road junctions in Japan